Sinezona cingulata is a species of minute sea snail, a marine gastropod mollusk in the family Scissurellidae.

Description
The size of the extremely minute shell varies between 0.6 mm and 1 mm. The white, fragile and thin shell has a globose-turbinate shape. The spire is very short and obtuse. The three whorls are very convex, and rapidly increasing. They are sculptured with distant elevated radiating lamellae. The body whorl is very large, globose, with longitudinal rather distant lamellae. The interstices are decussated by numerous very fine growth lines and spiral lirulae. The anal fasciole starts on the body whorl opposite the aperture, terminating in a long, narrow slit which does not attain the edge of the peristome. Its elevated margins are irregular and lamellar. The ovate aperture is narrower above.

Distribution
This marine species has a wide distribution. It occurs off the West Indies, West Africa and in the Mediterranean Sea.

References

 Rolán E., 2005. Malacological Fauna From The Cape Verde Archipelago. Part 1, Polyplacophora and Gastropoda
 Geiger D.L. (2012) Monograph of the little slit shells. Volume 1. Introduction, Scissurellidae. pp. 1–728. Volume 2. Anatomidae, Larocheidae, Depressizonidae, Sutilizonidae, Temnocinclidae. pp. 729–1291. Santa Barbara Museum of Natural History Monographs Number 7. [

External links
 

Scissurellidae
Gastropods described in 1861
Molluscs of the Atlantic Ocean